Raba' Awlad Hassan is a sub-district located in Bilad Ar Rus District, Sana'a Governorate, Yemen. Raba' Awlad Hassan had a population of 4711 according to the 2004 census.

References 

Sub-districts in Bilad Ar Rus District